Eregar Tukaram is an Indian politician and a MLA from Sandur constituency. He was the Minister of Medical Education in H D Kumaraswamy second ministry.

Constituency
He represents the Sandur assembly constituency.

Political Party
He is from the Indian National Congress.

References 

Living people
Karnataka MLAs 2008–2013
Indian National Congress politicians from Karnataka
Karnataka MLAs 2018–2023
1967 births